is a former Japanese football player.

Playing career
Nishimura was released by Nagoya Grampus after nine-season with the club on 10 November 2016, going on to announce his retirement from the game on 30 December 2016.

Club statistics

References

External links

1984 births
Living people
Association football people from Mie Prefecture
Japanese footballers
J1 League players
J2 League players
Kyoto Sanga FC players
Nagoya Grampus players
Association football goalkeepers